Jean-Jacques Pelletier (born 1947 in Montreal, Quebec) is a French Canadian philosophy professor and author. Pelletier was a long-time philosophy teacher with the Lévis-Lauzon post-secondary school, but is best known in several media as an author of French-language thrillers, some of which have an element of fantasy. Many of his works have received critical acclaim, as his short story "La Bouche barbelée" won a CBC/Radio-Canada contest in 1993.

Pelletier has had several other works published as well, and his works Blunt - Les treize derniers jours and La Chair disparue were published as serials in the popular Montreal magazine La Presse in 1997–1998.

La Chair disparue was chosen for inclusion in the French version of Canada Reads, broadcast on Radio-Canada in 2005, where it was defended by pianist Alain Lefèvre.

Bibliography

Novels

 L'Homme trafiqué (1987)
 L'Homme à qui il poussait des bouches (1994, novella)
 La Femme trop tard (1994)
 Blunt - Les treize derniers jours (1996)
 L'Assassiné de l'intérieur (1997)
Les Gestionnaires de l'Apocalypse series:
 La Chair disparue (1998)
 L'Argent du monde (1 & 2) (2001)
 Le Bien des autres (1 & 2) (2003–2004)
 La Faim de la Terre (1 & 2) (2009)
 Les visages de l'humanité (2012)
 Dix petits hommes blancs (2014)

Essays
 "Caisse de retraite et placements" (1994)
 "Écrire pour inquiéter et pour construire" (2002)
  "Les taupes frénétiques" (2012) Hurtubise Editions
  "La fabrique de l'extrême" (2012) Hurtubise Editions
  "La Prison de l'urgence" (2013) Hurtubise Editions
  "Questions d'écriture" (2014) Hurtubise Editions

Short stories
 "L'Homme qui avait avalé un gouffre" (1992)
 "La Bouche barbelée" (1993)
 "L'Enfant bosselé" (1994)
 L'Assassiné de l'intérieur (1997, collection)
 "La Mort aux dents" (2001)

External links
http://www.jeanjacquespelletier.com/ (Official site, in French)

1947 births
Living people
Canadian male novelists
Canadian philosophers
Writers from Montreal
Canadian short story writers in French
Canadian novelists in French
Canadian male essayists
Canadian male short story writers
Université Laval alumni
20th-century Canadian short story writers
21st-century Canadian short story writers
20th-century Canadian essayists
21st-century Canadian essayists
20th-century Canadian male writers
21st-century Canadian male writers
20th-century Canadian novelists
21st-century Canadian novelists